Timothy Michael Tierney (October 3, 1943 – September 15, 2012) was an American football player and coach. He served as the head football coach at California State University, Hayward—now known as California State University, East Bay—from 1975 to 1993, compiling a record of 77–109–5.

Tierney was born on October 3, 1943, in Buffalo, New York, and grew up in San Francisco, where he graduated from St. Ignatius High School—now known as St. Ignatius College Preparatory. He played college football as San Francisco State University, earning All-Far Western Conference honors twice as a defensive back.

Tierney was the defensive coordinator at Homestead High School in Sunnyvale, California in 1969. He moved on to Cal State Hayward in 1970 to serve as defensive coordinator under head football coach Les Davis. Tierney remained defensive coordinator for five seasons, through Bob Rodrigo's four-year stint as head coach, before succeeding Rodrigo in 1975. Tierney had the longest tenure, 19 seasons, of the four head coaches of the Cal State Hayward Pioneers football program. After the dissolution of the football program following the 1993 season, Tierney remained at Cal State Hawyard, working as a professor of kinesiology until 2001 and then serving as head coach of the men's and women's golf teams.

Tierney died on September 15, 2012, from complications following brain surgery.

Head coaching record

References

1943 births
2012 deaths
American football defensive backs
Cal State Hayward Pioneers football coaches
San Francisco State Gators football coaches
San Francisco State Gators football players
College golf coaches in the United States
High school football coaches in California
California State University, East Bay faculty
Sportspeople from Buffalo, New York
Coaches of American football from California
Players of American football from San Francisco